George Nassar (born June 1932) is an American murderer; Albert DeSalvo allegedly confessed to being the Boston Strangler to Nassar in late 1965. Nassar contacted his lawyer F. Lee Bailey and informed him of this confession, which led to DeSalvo becoming the prime suspect in the unsolved Strangler murders.

Life

Early life

Nassar was born in Providence, Rhode Island, the oldest of two children of Henry Nassar and Helen (née George), both of Syriac descent. Henry had come to America with his parents as a child and worked at various mills in Lawrence, Massachusetts. He died there in 1955. Helen was born in Dover, New Hampshire, and worked as a bobbin setter in mills; a previous marriage (that ended in 1931) to a man named Lawrence Otis, yielded one son named after his father. Nassar has one sister named Eileen. Eileen and George grew up in Lawrence, and were Catholics. George was involved in sports, and was a Boy Scout. At school, his teachers found him reserved, quiet, and a poor mixer.

First murder

George first ran afoul of the law while he was in his sophomore year. In May 1948, he and two of his friends, Gennaro Pullino and William Kenney went on a robbery spree that netted eighty dollars. In one of the places they hit, shopowner Dominic Kirmil lunged at the trio with a Coke bottle; Nassar pulled out a nickel-plated revolver from his dark-colored trench coat and shot Kirmil four times. The shopkeeper died three hours later from the loss of blood. Several witnesses described Nassar's distinct trench coat to the police.

On May 20, Nassar was picked up by Lawrence patrolmen Charles Keenan and Walter Sliva after crashing a stolen car on Route 2 in Ayer, Massachusetts. Initially charged with auto theft, Nassar soon became a prominent suspect in the Kirmil murder. The police found two thirty-eight-caliber bullets in his pocket, and the nickel-plated revolver used in the murder in the wrecked car. Nassar and his friends Pullino and Kenney were indicted and pleaded guilty to a second degree murder charge. They were formally sentenced to life in prison.

Nassar was sent to the prison MCI-Norfolk in Norfolk, Massachusetts. Once there, Nassar formed a friendship with Unitarian minister William Moors and joined the Prison's Debating Society. Through the efforts of Moors, Nassar was paroled early in 1961. The Boston Strangler slayings would begin the following year.

Hilton's murder

On September 29, 1964, Nassar brutally murdered 44-year-old Texaco station owner Irvin Hilton in full view of Rita Buote and her 14-year-old daughter Diane. As Buote pulled in to the station, Nassar fired one shot into the kneeling Hilton, and three more after he crumpled to the floor. Then he approached Buote's car, and tried to get her to open up. Failing, he jumped into another car and drove off toward North Andover. A truck driver, William King, wrote down the plate number and called the police.

The getaway car was found later that evening on a street in Andover next to Phillips Academy. The police soon learned that the car had been stolen earlier that day from near the Massachusetts Institute of Technology in Cambridge. The car belonged to a navy lieutenant who was attending MIT. A thirty-two-caliber nickel-plated Harrington & Richardson revolver and a twenty-two caliber Astra semi-automatic pistol were found underneath the front seat of the car. Shells from the revolver were found at the crime scene and matched the bullets found in Hilton.

An autopsy on Hilton revealed that he had been shot six times at close range, and stabbed in the back. The police theorized that the murderer had made Hilton beg for his life while shooting him.

A description given by Rita and Diane Buote enabled Andover police officer William Tammany to draw a composite of the killer. On spotting the drawing, Nassar's former arresting officer Keenan was struck by its familiarity. He went through his files and came up with a photograph of Nassar, which the Buotes positively identified as the man they saw shooting Hilton.

Nassar was found living in the Mattapan section of Boston. The Andover, Lawrence, and state police contacted the Boston police department, and got a warrant at Dorchester District Court to search the suspect's car and his apartment on 51 Deering Road. When the police arrived, they found Nassar with a social worker. A hunting knife was also located and confiscated.

Nassar was subsequently arrested and sent to Bridgewater to await his trial. He was said to have schizophrenic tendencies and was put under observation when he met DeSalvo. On June 26, 1965, a jury found Nassar guilty of Hilton's murder, with no recommendation for mercy. He received the death sentence, and was placed on Death Row at Walpole State Prison pending appeal. On June 7, 1966, his sentence was struck down by the Massachusetts Supreme Judicial Court, and later changed to life imprisonment.

Later life

Nassar was convicted in 1967 of murder in the first degree and that conviction was upheld following plenary or de novo review.  In 1982, Nassar filed an unsuccessful pro se motion for a new trial.  When that motion was denied Nassar filed a one-sentence “motion for leave to appeal,” which was effectively abandoned.

Nassar and other Massachusetts prisoners were transferred to federal custody in the summer of 1980.  Nassar and seven other prisoners successfully challenged the transfers in a 1981 civil suit.  Because the prisoners did not receive reclassification hearings and other procedures mandated by Massachusetts law, they were returned to Massachusetts custody.

Nassar was being held in federal prison in Leavenworth, Kansas, as recently as 1983.  Nassar is currently at Massachusetts Correctional Institution – Shirley.

After twenty years, Nassar moved again for a new trial, which motion was denied.  The Supreme Judicial Court of Massachusetts, in affirming the denial of the motion, wrote:  “Nassar claimed in his motion that he was unable, in 1983, to show good cause not to dismiss the matter because at that time, he was incarcerated in the Federal prison in Leavenworth, Kansas, without access to Massachusetts legal materials.  However, he was returned to Massachusetts in December, 1983, but did not seek to reopen the matter or inquire as to its status at that time, or at any time thereafter for over twenty years. We perceive no error or abuse of discretion in declining to reopen the proceedings after such a long period of inaction.”

Nassar's appeal was denied by the Massachusetts Supreme Judicial Court on February 15, 2008.

See also 

 Albert DeSalvo
 Boston Strangler

References 

1932 births
Living people
American people convicted of murder
American people of Assyrian descent
American prisoners sentenced to life imprisonment
Criminals from Rhode Island
People convicted of murder by Massachusetts
Prisoners sentenced to life imprisonment by Massachusetts
People from Mattapan